This List of Marshals of Portugal contains the names of people who received the title of Marshal-General, Army Marshal, or Air Marshal in the history of the Portuguese Armed Forces.

Marshal-Generals 
 William, Count of Schaumburg-Lippe (1762)
 José António Francisco Lobo da Silveira, Marquis of Alvito (1768)
 João Carlos de Bragança, Duke of Lafões (1791)
 Arthur Wellesley, 1st Duke of Wellington (1809)
 William Carr Beresford, 1st Viscount Beresford (1816)
 Nuno Caetano Álvares Pereira de Melo, Duke of Cadaval (1832)
 Louis-Auguste-Victor, Count de Ghaisnes de Bourmont (1833)
 Prince-consort Auguste de Beauharnais (1835)
 King-consort Ferdinand II of Portugal (1836)
 King Pedro V of Portugal (1855)
 King Luís I of Portugal (1861)
 King Carlos I of Portugal (1889)
 King Manuel II of Portugal (1908)

Army Marshals 
 José António Francisco Lobo da Silveira, Marquis of Alvito (1762)
 Christian August, Prince of Waldeck and Pyrmont (1792)
 Karl Alexander von der Goltz (1800)
 Charles du Houx de Vioménil (1801)
 William Carr Beresford, 1st Viscount Beresford (1809)
 Manuel Pamplona Carneiro Rangel, Viscount of Beire (1833)
 Jean-Baptiste Solignac (1833) 
 António José Severim de Noronha, 1st Duke of Terceira (1833)
 João Carlos de Saldanha Oliveira e Daun, 1st Duke of Saldanha (1833)
 António Vicente de Queirós, Count of Ponte de Santa Maria (1860)
 President Manuel Gomes da Costa (1926)
 President Óscar Carmona (1947)
 President António de Spínola (1981)
 President Francisco da Costa Gomes (1982)

Air Marshals 
 President Francisco Craveiro Lopes (1958)
 Humberto Delgado (1990 - posthumously)

See also 
 Marshal of Portugal

References

Sources 
 SOBRAL, José J. X., Marechais portugueses, Audaces, 2008

Field marshals of Portugal
Portugal
Marshals